James Patton was an American Negro league pitcher between 1909 and 1913.

Patton made his Negro leagues debut in 1907 with the Birmingham Giants and played for Birmingham again the following season. He went on to play for the Philadelphia Giants in 1909 and the French Lick Plutos in 1913.

References

External links
 and Seamheads

Year of birth missing
Year of death missing
Place of birth missing
Place of death missing
Birmingham Giants players
French Lick Plutos players
Philadelphia Giants players
Baseball pitchers